Menteng is an administrative village in the Menteng district of Indonesia. It has a postal code of 10310. It is located on the southern area of the Menteng Project.

See also
 List of administrative villages of Jakarta

Administrative villages in Jakarta